Nanoose Bay station is a former railway station in Nanoose Bay, British Columbia. The station was a stop on Via Rail's Dayliner service, which ended in 2011. The station is on the Southern Railway of Vancouver Island mainline.

Footnotes

External links 
Via Rail Station Description

Via Rail stations in British Columbia
Railway stations in Canada opened in 1930
Railway stations closed in 2011
Disused railway stations in Canada